The Raigam Tele'es Merit Awards are presented annually in Sri Lanka by the Kingdom of Raigam associated with many commercial brands to uplift the talent of Sri Lankan actors and actresses, as well as technical crew who gained positive reviews from critics for their role in television screen.

The award was first given in 2005. The following is a list of the winners of these awards since then.

Award winners

References

Raigam Tele'es